Government Degree College Chagarmatti Peshawar is a public sector degree college located in Chagarmatti, Peshawar Khyber Pakhtunkhwa in Pakistan. The college is affiliated with University of Peshawar for its degree programs.

See also  
 Edwardes College Peshawar
 Islamia College Peshawar
 Government College Peshawar
 Government Superior Science College Peshawar
 Government College Hayatabad Peshawar
 Government Degree College Naguman Peshawar
 Government Degree College Mathra Peshawar
 Government Degree College Badaber Peshawar
 Government Degree College Wadpagga Peshawar
 Government Degree College Achyni Payan Peshawar

External links 
 Government Degree College Chagarmatti Peshawar Official Website

References 

Colleges in Peshawar
Universities and colleges in Peshawar